Sportclub Germania Bremen was a German association football club based in the Hanseatic city of Bremen. Established in 1899, the club was one of several short-lived Bremen-based clubs that bore the name Germania around the turn of the century. The side played in the Verband Bremer Ballspiel Vereine and was a founding member of the DFB (Deutscher Fußball Bund, en:German Football Association) at Leipzig in 1900. The club soon disappeared from the German football scene.

Football clubs in Germany
Defunct football clubs in Germany
Sport in Bremen (city)
Defunct football clubs in Bremen (state)
Association football clubs established in 1899
1899 establishments in Germany